Statistics of Czechoslovak First League in the 1984–85 season.

Overview
It was contested by 16 teams, and Sparta Prague won the championship. Ivo Knoflíček was the league's top scorer with 21 goals.

Stadia and locations

League standings

Results

Top goalscorers

References

Czechoslovakia - List of final tables (RSSSF)

Czechoslovak First League seasons
Czech
1984–85 in Czechoslovak football